1970 Soviet Class A Second Group was a Soviet football competition at the Soviet third tier.

Qualifying groups

Group I [Ukraine and Belarus]

Group II [Centre and Caucasus]

Group III [Siberia and Central Asia]

References
 All-Soviet Archive Site
 Results. RSSSF

Soviet Second League seasons
3
Soviet
Soviet